The 2021 Dubai Sevens was held as two rugby sevens tournaments on consecutive weekends in late November and early December that year. They were played as the fifty-first season of the Dubai Sevens, following the cancellation of the 2020 tournament due to impacts of the COVID-19 pandemic.

These events in Dubai were the opening tournaments of the 2021–22 World Rugby Sevens Series. Due to ongoing impacts of the pandemic, the first event was played behind closed doors on 26–27 November 2021, with no spectators allowed. The second event was played on 3–4 December in front of full crowds.

As only twelve men's teams instead of the usual sixteen competed in 2021 at Dubai, the Olympic format of three pools with four teams in each was used for both tournaments. The Sevens stadium in Dubai provided two fields for use in these events, which allowed matches in overlapping time slots to be played.

South Africa won back-to-back titles in Dubai, defeating the United States in the final of the first tournament and Australia in the final of the second tournament.

Format 
The twelve teams at each tournament were drawn into three pools of four teams. A round-robin was held for each pool, where each team played the others in their pool once. The top two teams from each pool, plus the two best third-placed on comparative pool standings, advanced to the Cup quarterfinals to compete for tournament honours. The other teams from each pool went to the challenge playoffs for ninth to twelfth place.

Teams 
The twelve national men's teams competing at both tournaments in Dubai were:

 
 
 
 
 
 
 
 
 
 
 
 

Core teams eligible to play but not participating at Dubai were:
  England, Scotland and Wales, who were represented by Great Britain for the first two tournaments of the 2021–22 Series, before competing again as separate national unions for the remainder of the series.

 New Zealand and Samoa, who did not participate in Dubai due to the challenges of COVID-19 travel logistics.

Dubai: Event I 
The first tournament was held with no crowd in attendance at The Sevens stadium in Dubai on 26–27 November 2021. South Africa won the tournament, defeating United States by 42–7 in the final.

All times in UAE Standard Time (UTC+4:00). The pools were scheduled as follows:

Key:  Team advanced to the quarterfinals

Pool A – Event I

Pool B – Event I

Pool C – Event I

9th to 12th playoffs – Event I

5th to 8th playoffs – Event I

Cup playoffs – Event I

Placings – Event I 

Source: World Rugby

Dubai: Event II 
The second tournament was played with spectators in attendance at The Sevens stadium in Dubai on 3–4 December 2021. South Africa won the tournament, defeating Australia by 10–7 in the final.

All times in UAE Standard Time (UTC+4:00). The pools were scheduled as follows:

Key:  Team advanced to the quarterfinals

Pool A – Event II

Pool B – Event II

Pool C – Event II

9th to 12th playoffs – Event II

5th to 8th playoffs – Event II

Cup playoffs – Event II

Placings – Event II 

Source: World Rugby

See also 
 2021 Dubai Women's Sevens

References

External links 
 Tournament site
 World Rugby info: Event I
 World Rugby info: Event II

2021
2021–22 World Rugby Sevens Series
2021 in Emirati sport
2021 in Asian rugby union
Dubai Sevens
Dubai Sevens